Lékoumou (can also be written as Lekumu) is a department of the Republic of the Congo in the southern part of the country. It borders the departments of Bouenza, Niari, Plateaux, Pool, and the nation of Gabon. The regional capital is Sibiti.  Principal cities and towns include Komono and Zanaga.

Administrative divisions 
Lékoumou Department is divided into five districts:

Districts 
 Sibiti District
 Komono District
 Zanaga District
 Bambama District
 Mayéyé District

Economy 
Subsistence farming, carried out by small producers (cassava, peanuts, tarots, plantain, squash, sorrel, ginger, artisanal palm oil), and arboriculture (safoutiers, mango trees, bananas) are the main agricultural activities. The timber industry is an important activity. The Lékoumou contains iron deposits, the most important of which is that of Zanaga. Its exploitation by a partnership between the South African Zanaga Iron Ore Company and the Swiss group Glencore Xstrata, is subject to the rise in world iron prices.

The region offers tourist wealth oriented towards the discovery of the country, the forest, the villages and their products. A liana bridge, located towards Bambama, near the village of Simonbondo, on the Gabonese border, is famous for the choice of natural materials and their assembly, making it possible to cross 74 m. without intermediate support

References

Republic of the Congo at GeoHive

 
Departments of the Republic of the Congo